Legend of the Swordsmen of the Mountains of Shu is a 1932 historical fantasy novel written by the Sichuanese writer Huanzhulouzhu. The book was later made into the 1983 film Zu Warriors from the Magic Mountain.

Synopsis

Adaptations
The book has been adapted into television shows and films:
Zu: Warriors from the Magic Mountain (1983 Hong Kong film)
The Gods and Demons of Zu Mountain (1990 Hong Kong TV series)
The Zu Mountain Saga (1991 Hong Kong TV series)
The Legend of Zu (2001 Hong Kong film)
Legend of Zu Mountain (2015 Chinese TV series)

References

1932 debut novels
Shenmo novels
Wuxia novels
Novels set in Sichuan
Chinese Republican era novels
Chinese novels adapted into films
Chinese novels adapted into television series